Syngrapha ignea, the mountain beauty,  is a moth of the family Noctuidae. The species was first described by Augustus Radcliffe Grote in 1864. It is found from northern Alaska south to southern California and New Mexico, with a disjunct population in Labrador. It is also found sparingly across the boreal forest and the subarctic.

The wingspan is 29–32 mm. Adults are on wing from June to August depending on the location. There is one generation per year.

The larvae feed on Vaccinium and Salix species.

Subspecies
Syngrapha ignea ignea
Syngrapha ignea simulans (Labrador, northern Quebec)

External links

Plusiinae
Moths of North America
Moths described in 1864